The Rally of Turkey (also known as Anatolian Rally) is a rally competition on the FIA World Rally Championship (WRC) schedule.

History
First international rally in Turkey was held in 1972, starting and finishing in Istanbul. In 1999, the idea of creating an all-new event as a WRC candidate was conceived. The next year in 2000, the Anatolian Rally based in İzmir was born. After being observed by the FIA, the rally became an official reserve event for the WRC.

Antalya and Kemer, a holiday region in southwestern Turkey was chosen in 2001 as the start and finish venue for the Anatolian Rally adopting a WRC format. In 2002, first foreign entries took part, Sébastien Loeb in a Citroën Saxo and Juuso Pykälistö in a Peugeot 206 WRC.

Turkey debuted in the World Rally Championship in the 2003 season in which only 27 of the 62 entries finished. The first two years were dedicated to Junior World Rally Championship (JWRC) for gaining experience. In 2005, the Rally of Turkey hosted for the first time Production Car World Rally Championship (PWRC) drivers.

76 rally teams took part in the 2005 Rally of Turkey. Only 53 teams finished the total distance of 1,228 km. Repeating his victory of previous year, Sébastien Loeb of France won the cup at 4.21.48.00' with his co-driver Daniel Elena.

The 2006 event was held from October 13 to October 15, 2006 around Kemer – Kumluca – Antalya in southwestern Turkey on rough, gravel roads up into occasionally snowy mountain roads. Rally headquarters and the service park were located in Kemer.

The Rally of Turkey returned to the WRC calendar in for the 2008 season. The 2008 Rally of Turkey took place between June 12–15 and was won by Mikko Hirvonen ahead of Jari-Matti Latvala and Sébastien Loeb. The rally was removed from the calendar after the 2010 event.

The Rally of Turkey was revived for the 2018 championship as a replacement for Rally Poland. The event was based in the town of Marmaris in Muğla Province.

Winners 
Pink background indicates that in that year the rally was not part of WRC calendar.

References

External links

 Rally of Turkey official site
 Rally of Turkey - Anatolian at eWRC-results

 
Recurring sporting events established in 1972
Turkey
Antalya Province
Turkey